The Japan Composer's Association, or JACOMPA (日本作曲家協会 in Japanese) is an organization of Japanese composers, established in 1959. Among its members are some of Japan's most renowned composers of contemporary classical music.

Presidents 
Masao Koga (1958–1978)
Ryoichi Hattori (1978–1993)
Tadashi Yoshida (1993–1997)
Toru Funamura (1997–2005)
Minoru Endo (2005–2008)
Takashi Miki (2008–2009)
Katsuhisa Hattori (2009-2013)
Gendai Kano (2013-)

See also 
Japan Record Award

External links
Japan Composer's Association site 
Japan Composer's Association > Association policy(partially English) 

 
Music organizations based in Japan
Organizations established in 1959
1959 establishments in Japan